Nicholas John Chatterton (born 18 May 1954), is an English retired footballer who played as a midfielder in the Football League. Chatterton was born in South Norwood, London.

Chatterton started his career in 1973 at Crystal Palace, where he was the son of the club's groundskeeper Len Chatterton. In November 1978, he moved to neighbouring south London club, Millwall. In 1986, he moved to Colchester United, where he finished his career.

References

External links

1954 births
Living people
English footballers
People from South Norwood
Association football midfielders
Crystal Palace F.C. players
Millwall F.C. players
Colchester United F.C. players
English Football League players
Footballers from the London Borough of Croydon
Outfield association footballers who played in goal